Scrayingham is a village and civil parish in North Yorkshire, England. It was historically part of the East Riding of Yorkshire until 1974. The population was less than 100 at the 2011 census. Details are included in the civil parish of Howsham, North Yorkshire.

Scrayingham is significant for being the parish where George Hudson was born and buried. Today the area has a horse riding school, a few small businesses and a mixture of modern stone cottages built in the Georgian style, and traditional preserved cottages from earlier times. It also has a post office.

The hamlet of Leppington,  to the north-east, forms part of the parish.

In 1823 Scrayingham was a civil parish in the Wapentake of Buckrose and the East Riding of Yorkshire. The living for the ecclesiastical parish and the parish church of St Peter's was under the patronage of the King. Population at the time was 157, with occupations including nine farmers, two tailors, a cooper, and the landlord of The Horse & Jockey public house. Resident in the parish was a schoolmaster, the parish curate, and a yeoman.

References

Villages in North Yorkshire
Civil parishes in North Yorkshire